Yenshööbü ovogt Byambyn Rinchen (25 December 1905 – 4 March 1977), also known in Russian as Rinchin-Dorzhi Radnazhapovich Bimbaev, was one of the founders of modern Mongolian literature, a translator of literature and a scholar in various areas of Mongolian studies, especially linguistics.

Descent 
Like Dashdorjiin Natsagdorj, he was a direct descendant of Genghis Khan on both his father Radnajab and mother Dulmaa's side. His ancestors held the public office of golova (head) of a stepnaya duma (steppe council, local self-government unit) in the territory of future Buryatia and the hereditary title of Taisha (Genghisid prince) until 1822. They were members of the Yenshööbü-Songool tribe (a Buryaticized Khalkha tribe) and were descendants of Okhin Taij who had submitted to Peter I of Russia in 1696 after fleeing from Inner Mongolia. Okhin Taij was the grandson of Choghtu Khong Tayiji who was descended from Dayan Khan making him a descendant of Genghis Khan via Kublai Khan in the line of Tolui.
His father Radnajab Bimbaev (1874–1921) was an interpreter-translator of the Manchu language at Kyakhta frontier commissariat, later in the period of the Far Eastern Republic worked as a head of public education in Chikoy aimak (district) administration, author of Russian-Mongolian and Mongolian-Russian dictionaries.

Early years 
Byambyn Rinchen was born in 1905 in Bol'shoy Lug place of Troitskosavsky uyezd (district), today the surroundings of Kyakhta, in the border zone of Russia and Mongolia (Kyakhta in Buryatia and Altanbulag sum in Selenge Province). 
He mastered the Mongolian, Russian, and Manchu languages in the days of his childhood. In 1914 he started his studies in Alekseevsky non-classical secondary school (real'noe uchilishhe, Realschule), and graduated in 1920.
In early 1920s Kyakhta became the center of revolutionary activities of Damdin Sükhbaatar and Khorloogiin Choibalsan. On 1–3 March 1921 the first congress of the Mongolian People's Party (MPP) took place in Troitskosavsk, and B. Rinchen also participated as an interpreter.
At that time he also met Konstantin Rokossovsky, then the commander of the 35th Independent Cavalry Regiment of the Red Army.
In 1923–24, B. Rinchen studied in a pedagogical school in Verkhneudinsk. In 1924 he was sent to Leningrad for studying, together with other Mongolian boys. He entered Leningrad Institute of Oriental Languages, studied under such well-known scholars-orientalists as Boris Vladimirtsov, Fyodor Shcherbatskoy, Sergey Oldenburg, Lev Shcherba, Vasily Bartold, Vasily Alekseev. After graduating in 1927, with the diploma of orientalist, B. Rinchen started working in scientific committee of Mongolia.
From the first steps in his research work he showed himself primarily as a philologist - linguist and literary critic. At the same time B. Rinchen showed interest in other fields of knowledge, in particular, ethnography and religious studies. During this period he wrote his first poems and short stories.

Fiction writer 
He wrote many novels and short stories including now classic works of Mongolian literature, many of them in the compulsory program of Mongolian schools, as Anu hatun (Queen Anu), Zaan Zaluudai, Ikh nuudel (Great migration), Ber ceceg (Flower of the bride), Nuucyg zadruulsan zahia (Letter of Betrayal) and Shüherch Buniya (Buniya, the Parachutist).

He also wrote a movie script based on the biography of Choghtu Tayiji that won the State prize in the mid-1940s. He transferred all the prize money to support orphans of World War II in Leningrad.

His novel Üüriin tuyaa ('Dawn', based on modern Mongolian history) was issued in Russian, Czech and Chinese.

There are some translations of Rinchen's work into other languages such as English and German.

Translator

He was proficient in Russian, Manchu, French, English, Chinese, Polish, Czech, German and Esperanto.

He translated the works of Gorki, Mayakovsky, Sholovkhov, Maupassant and Hikmet into Mongolian, gaining wide recognition for these authors in Mongolia.
In the period from 1920 to 1970 B. Rinchen translated into Mongolian 240 works of over 70 authors from 20 countries.

Scholar

In 1956, Rinchen defended his doctorate in linguistics at the Eötvös Loránd University in Budapest with a "Grammar of Written Mongolian". In 1964 he published the first Esperanto-Mongolian dictionary. From 1964 to 1967, he researched the language of Mongolian monuments, historical and modern phonology and script, etymology and morphology. In 1969, he published a grammar on Khamnigan, a Mongolic language. In 1979, the "Atlas of Mongolian ethnography and linguistics" that had been prepared under his guidance and was to become one of the most important works in Mongolian dialectology was published posthumously.<ref>Bayansan and Odontör (1995): Hel shinjleliin ner tomyoonii züilchilsen tailbar tol''': 132-134</ref>

Rinchen also edited diverse materials on Mongolian Shamanism, historical linguistic documents and folklore.<ref>Bayansan and Odontör (1995): Hel shinjleliin ner tomyoonii züilchilsen tailbar tol': 134</ref>

Rinchen's son Rinchen Barsbold is a famous Mongolian paleontologist and geologist.

Chronological selected bibliography

 (ed.) Iz nashevo kul'turnovo naslediya: sbornik stat'ei [From our cultural heritage: Collected papers]. Ulaanbaatar, 1968.
 Mongol ard ulsyn hamnigan ayalguu. Ulaanbaatar: Shinjleh uhaanii akademi, 1969.
 (ed.) Mongol ard ulsyn ugsaatny sudlal helnij šinžlelijn atlas''. Ulaanbaatar: Shinjleh uhaanii akademi, 1979.

References

External links
 Some works and poems by Rinchen including "Mongol hel" and "Shüherch Biniya"
 Zaan zaluudai

1905 births
1977 deaths
Mongolian writers
Mongolian academics
Mongolists
Mongolian orientalists
Dialectologists
Mongolian translators
Translators from Polish
Translators from Russian
Translators from French
Translators to Mongolian
Buryat people
20th-century translators
Eötvös Loránd University alumni